Aagey Se Right is a 2009 Indian Hindi-language comedy film directed by Indrajit Nattoji. It features Shreyas Talpade, Kay Kay Menon, Mahi Gill, Shenaz Treasurywala and Shiv Panditt in the lead roles. It was produced by Ronnie Screwvala under the UTV Motion Pictures. The film released on 4 September 2009  and although it failed to do well at the box office, it was praised for its lavish title sequence, looks and design.

Plot
Dinkar Waghmare (Shreyas Talpade) hails from a small town. He is a 28-year-old sub-inspector with the Mumbai Police who spends his time dreaming of beautiful TV reporter Soniya Bhatt (Mahi Gill). He has never solved a case and has always stayed away from serious action. His late father was a successful police officer. He is constantly reminded of his failure by his nagging mother and feels pressure to live up to his father's larger-than-life image. One day Dinkar loses his Bajrangbali-stickered gun and is under extreme pressure to find it.

Meanwhile, terrorist Balma Rashid-ul-Khairi (Kay Kay Menon), alias Janu, has arrived in Mumbai planning to bomb several locations in the city. However, he falls in love with Mumbai life and a bargirl named Pearl (Shenaz Treasurywala). But when Janu abandons his life of violence to romance Pearl, his chief comes to Mumbai to complete his mission and kill both Janu and Pearl. As he pursues his gun around Mumbai, Dinkar accidentally becomes a hero when he saves the mayor's life and then prevents the daughter of the police commissioner from committing suicide.

He meets Soniya who falls in love with the city's new hero. He is promoted to inspector and is assigned to head security at the Mumbai Police Show. The terrorist chief plants a bomb under the stage as planned, but Janu comes to defuse it as it is about to explode when Pearl starts her number. With the help of Dinkar, Janu defuses the bomb. The terrorist's plot is foiled and Dinkar is able to retrieve his gun and avoid humiliation.

Cast
 Shreyas Talpade as Dinkar Waghmare
 Kay Kay Menon as Janu a.k.a. Balma-Rashidul Khairi
 Mahi Gill as Soniya Bhatt
 Shenaz Treasurywala as Pearl
 Shiv Panditt as Sunny
 Shruti Seth as Suhasi
 Vijay Maurya as Raghav Shetty
 Rakesh Bedi as Police Commissioner
 Rajesh Khera as T.V. Vinod
 Shaukat Baig as Parsi Baba
 Nawab Shah as Mojassama
 Bharti Achrekar as Kaanta Aai 
 Sarthak Bhasin as Lucky Singh
 Karan Veer Mehra as Rocky
 Vipul Vig as Vikki
 Sanjay Sharma as Bheem
 Rajesh Singh as Goli
 Anil Bapu Gawas as Mayor
 Arvind Parab as Johnny Quarter

Box office
The film did average business at the box office largely due to lack of publicity and no promotions for the music. The timing of the theatrical release was at the time of Muharram a time of religious austerity for the audience. The film also failed to garner immediate critical acclaim though reports from the audience was positive with unofficial blogs being written on the movie as the most underrated gem of the year and fair amount of positive viewer comments.

Awards 
Aagey Se Right was nominated for the annual SXSW "Excellence in Title Design" Awards 2010, and was the only Indian finalist at the awards. The title design has been designed and animated by Upasana Nattoji.

References

External links
 
 
Aage Se Right Upcoming Movies of UTVMotionPictures
Aage Se Right Article on BusinessofCinema.com

2009 films
2000s Hindi-language films
Films set in Mumbai
Indian action comedy films
UTV Motion Pictures films
2009 action comedy films
2009 comedy films
Hindi-language comedy films